Tlajomulco de Zúñiga  is a city and municipality in the state of Jalisco in central-western Mexico. It forms part of the Guadalajara metropolitan area, lying to the southeast of it. It covers an area of 636.93 km2.  it had a population of 416,626.

Its name is interpreted from náhuatl as "Land in the Corner."

As it is part of the Guadalajara metropolitan area, it has an industrial base and is a large commercial area. It is also the location of Guadalajara International Airport.

Towns and villages

The municipality has the distinction of being the only one in Mexico with five cities (localities) of over 25,000 inhabitants. It is also the only one with 10, and with 11, of over 10,000 inhabitants. (Tijuana Municipality, Baja California and Chalco Municipality, State of Mexico both have nine.) The largest localities (cities, towns, and villages) are:

Toponymy  

History 

The area was conquered in 1530 by Nuño de Guzmán at the same time that the Indians of Tonalá were conquered. During the Viceroyalty of New Spain it was divided into the district of Nueva Galicia and was composed almost completely of the indigenous people who in turn were peasants.

During the following century it changed administrative functions and not until the 27 July 1939 did it get the name Tlajomulco de Zúñiga in honor of General Eugenio Zúñiga (native of Tlajomulco), and was converted into a leading municipality.

Its historical background dates back to the time when the Nahua people were here. The region of Tlajomulco belonged to the lordship of Tonallan and the inhabitants were called Tlajomulcas. In 1266, during the time of the King Tlajomulpilli, the town became powerful, dominating what today is known as Tala, Acatlán and other nearby towns.
Tlajomulco was founded with the authority of Lord De Tonalá, in appreciation to Pitláloc, Copaya, Pilili and Totoch, for resisting the invasion of the Purépecha. In the first half of the 16th century, Coyotl being a tyrant, suppressed the people of  Cuyutlán, Cuescomatitlán, Cajititlán, Atlixtac (Santa Anita) and Xuchitlán, with fees until in 1530 it was conquered by Nuño Beltrán de Guzmán, who upon arriving in Tlajomulco was well received by the tyrant Coyotl, who he helped in the conquest of Tonalá. The tyrant was baptized this same year and supported Nuño Beltrán de Guzmán and was called Pedro de Guzmán.

Seventeen plastic bags with human remains were found in colonia Chulavista in January 2021.

Government

Municipal presidents

References

Municipalities of Jalisco
Guadalajara metropolitan area